Filbert Bayi Sanka (born June 23, 1953) is a Tanzanian former middle-distance runner who competed throughout the 1970s. He set the world records for 1500 metres in 1974 and the mile in 1975. His world record in the 1500 m was also the Commonwealth Games record until 2022.

Running career
Born in a small village of Karatu, near Arusha, Tanzania, he had to run eight miles every day to and from school as a boy. His greatest moment was arguably the 1500 m final at the 1974 Commonwealth Games in Christchurch, New Zealand, when he won the gold medal ahead of New Zealand runner John Walker and Kenyan Ben Jipcho. Bayi set a new world record of 3 min 32.16 s, ratified by the IAAF as 3:32.2, and Walker went under the old world record set by Jim Ryun as well. Third place Jipcho, fourth place Rod Dixon, and fifth place Graham Crouch also ran the fourth, fifth, and seventh fastest 1500 m times to that date.  It is still classed as one of the greatest 1500 m races of all time.  There was no jockeying for position in the race; Bayi led from the beginning in a fast pace and was 20 metres ahead at 800 metres, the other runners strung out in a line behind him.

In 1975, Bayi broke Ryun's eight-year-old mile record by clocking 3:51.0 in Kingston, Jamaica on 17 May. The record was short-lived as Walker became history's first sub-3:50 miler on 12 August of the same year, running 3:49.4 at Gothenburg.

It was hoped that the Bayi-Walker clash would continue but, because Tanzania boycotted the 1976 Summer Olympics in Montreal, it never materialized. However, since Bayi was suffering from a bout of malaria shortly before the Olympics, he may not have been able to challenge Walker even had there been no boycott.

Bayi won a silver medal in the 3000 m steeplechase at the 1980 Summer Olympics in Moscow. He ran 8:12.5 behind Bronisław Malinowski.

He won the 1500 m race at the 1973 All-Africa Games, with Kipchoge Keino gaining silver. Bayi successfully defended his title at the 1978 All-Africa Games.

Later life
After retirement Bayi has spent much effort in setting up the Filbert Bayi Foundation which aims to guide young sporting talent in Tanzania. It is based in Mkuza, about 50 km from Dar es Salaam. The complex also aims to educate young people about HIV and AIDS, plus ways of getting out of poverty. The foundation started in 2003. Bayi has also opened a Primary and Nursery school based in Kimara, as well as the Secondary school which is based in Kibaha. The schools have been partnered with Barlby High School as part of the Dreams and Teams project set up by the British Council/Youth Sport Trust. The school hosted students from Barlby High School in January and February 2008.  Bayi is also a member of the IAAF Technical Committee and is Secretary-General of the Tanzanian Olympic Committee.

International competitions

References

External links

 Filbert Bayi Schools – Homepage

People from Arusha Region
1953 births
Living people
Tanzanian male middle-distance runners
Tanzanian steeplechase runners
Olympic athletes of Tanzania
Athletes (track and field) at the 1972 Summer Olympics
Athletes (track and field) at the 1980 Summer Olympics
Olympic silver medalists for Tanzania
Medalists at the 1980 Summer Olympics
Athletes (track and field) at the 1974 British Commonwealth Games
Athletes (track and field) at the 1978 Commonwealth Games
Commonwealth Games gold medallists for Tanzania
Commonwealth Games silver medallists for Tanzania
World record setters in athletics (track and field)
People from Karatu District
Olympic silver medalists in athletics (track and field)
Commonwealth Games medallists in athletics
African Games gold medalists for Tanzania
African Games medalists in athletics (track and field)
Athletes (track and field) at the 1978 All-Africa Games
Athletes (track and field) at the 1973 All-Africa Games
Medallists at the 1974 British Commonwealth Games
Medallists at the 1978 Commonwealth Games